The Movement for Rights and Freedoms ( Dvizhenie za prava i svobodi, ДПС, DPS; , HÖH) is a centrist political party in Bulgaria with a support base among ethnic minority communities.

It is a member of the Liberal International and the Alliance of Liberals and Democrats for Europe (ALDE). While representing the interests of Muslims, especially Turks and to a lesser extent Pomaks (Muslim Bulgarians); the party also receives the largest share of Romani votes. It's MP and oligarch Delyan Peevski was placed under US sanctions through the Magnitsky Act mechanism in May 2021.

History

The party was officially established in 1990, with its founder Ahmed Dogan serving as its leader until 2013. On 19 January 2013, Lyutfi Mestan was elected as the second chairman of the Movement for Rights and Freedoms. Mestan was removed from power by the insistence of the founder Dogan because he had declared support for Turkey for the shot Russian airplane in 2015, then Erdoğan blacklisted Ahmed Dogan, banning him from entering Turkey. Mestan formed his own party, named Democrats for Responsibility, Solidarity and Tolerance.

Electoral results

Starting in 1990 as the first political party of the Turkish minority participating in the parliamentary elections, in the first elections in 1990 after the end of the communist regime, which the Turks of the country had boycotted, the party won 6.0% of the popular vote and 24 out of 400 seats and became the fourth largest party in the parliament. In the parliamentary elections in 1991 it won 7.6% of the vote and remained with 24 seats in а 240-seater parliament. In the elections in 1994 it won 5.4% of the vote and its seats decreased to 15. In the elections in 1997 it won 7.6% of the vote and 19 out of 240 seats. From 2001 to 2009, the party was part of the government, first in a coalition with the National Movement Simeon II (NDSV) party and then with the Bulgarian Socialist Party (BSP). The party had ministers in the Sakskoburggotski Government, Stanishev Government and Oresharski Government (2013-2014).

It won in the elections in 2001 7.5% of the vote and 21 out of 240 seats. Subsequently, for the first time the party joined a coalition government, which was led by the winner of the elections (NDSV). Under the control of the party were two out of the 17 Bulgarian ministries – the Ministry of Agriculture and Forests and the Minister without portfolio, the other 15 remained under the control of senior coalition partner NDSV. At the 2005 elections it increased to 12.8% of vote and 34 out of 240 seats and was kept in power as a part of the coalition led by the Bulgarian Socialist Party (BSP) and National Movement Simeon II (NDSV) party. The ministries under the control of the Movement of Rights and Freedoms increased to three out of 18.

At the 2009 elections it increased to 14.0% of vote and 38 out of 240 seats. Following the election, the government was totally occupied by the decisive winner, the Citizens for European Development of Bulgaria (GERB) party and the Movement for Rights and Freedoms was еxcluded from the government and remained in opposition after having been part of coalition governments for the two consecutive preceding terms between 2001 and 2009. At the 2009 European Parliament elections the party won 14.1% of the vote and three MEPs out of Bulgaria's total representation of 18. Two of the MEPs are ethnic Turks (Filiz Husmenova and Metin Kazak) and one (Vladko Panayotov) is ethnic Bulgarian.

In the Bulgarian parliamentary election in 2013, the Movement for Rights and Freedoms decreased to 11.3% of the vote; it took 36 seats and remained the third biggest party. The DPS won the elections abroad with 41.3% and the most polling stations and voters in a foreign country were in Turkey.

The DPS won four MEPs in the 2014 European Parliament elections.

Controversies

Ethnic nature

On 8 October 1991, ninety-three members of Bulgaria's National Assembly — virtually all of them affiliated with the former Communist Party — asked the  constitutional court to declare the DPS unconstitutional citing article 11.4 of the constitution which explicitly bans political parties "formed on ethnic, racial, and religious basis". On 21 April 1992, the court rejected the petition and affirmed the constitutionality of the DPS.

Even though the DPS has been legally a part of Bulgarian political life since then, some Bulgarian nationalists, particularly the far-right National Union Attack, continue to assert that it is anti-constitutional because it consists mainly of ethnic Turks. However, the statute of the DPS states that it "is an independent public and political organization, founded with the purpose of contributing to the unity of all Bulgarian citizens".

Additionally, supporters of DPS argue that banning parties on the basis of their ethnic composition constitutes an instance of ethnic discrimination and is in contravention to European law, the Framework Convention for the Protection of National Minorities in particular to which Bulgaria is a signatory. Furthermore, despite a similar constitutional ban, religious parties, such as the Bulgarian Christian Coalition have competed for parliamentary elections since 1997, and again in 2005, without any political upheaval.

More recently, Antonina Zheliazkova, head of the Centre for Interethnic Relations in Sofia, praised Ahmed Dogan by stating that "He has been working hard to open up the party to all citizens and has encouraged the DPS's supporters to be free to vote for non-ethnic parties".

Other Turkish political factions
At present there are three other tiny Turkish political factions that oppose the DPS's politics. These groups — which united to form the Balkan Democratic League — are the Movement of the Democratic Wing (DDK), led by Osman Oktay; the Party for Democracy and Justice (PDS), led by Nedim Gencev; and the Union of the Bulgarian Turks (SBT), led by Seyhan Türkkan.

However, these movements, as well as the National Movement for Rights and Freedoms, member of a Social-Democratic coalition ('Rose coalition') failed to secure any elected representative in the parliament.  A party founded in 2011 by members who left the party and headed by Korman Ismailov—People's Party Freedom and Dignity, gained 1.5% of the vote in a coalition with National Movement Simeon II (NDSV) and therefore did not cross the 4% threshold to enter the parliament. This party was part of the Reformist Bloc and crossed the threshold and entered the parliament and the government in 2014, but only with one Deputy Minister that was removed. Another political fraction DOST founded by the former leader Mestan, had 17,000 registered members in 2016, which were obtained only for about one year. If so, the members of the Movement of Rights and Freedoms must have dropped in numbers.

Alleged manipulation of votes

The DPS was severely criticized by the Bulgarian ultra-nationalist party Attack as well as mainstream right-wing political parties such as Democrats for a Strong Bulgaria (DSB) and the Union of Democratic Forces (SDS) and even by DPS coalition partners of the National Movement Simeon II for allegedly manipulating the vote in the June 2005 elections in some places by bringing Bulgarian citizens of Turkish origin living in Turkey to vote in the elections. However, allegations of ethnic Turks coming to vote in Bulgaria at their permanent address and then returning to Turkey to vote with their passports, could not be "verified or confirmed" by international observers, whose assessment on the election was that it was free and fair.

Opposing privatization on ethnic grounds
In February 2005, the DPS opposed the privatisation of Bulgaria's largest tobacco company, Bulgartabac, which was backed by the government and the European Union, on the grounds that the industry traditionally employs ethnic Turks. The resulting crisis led to the resignation of vice premier Lydia Shouleva.

Delyan Peevski 

Delyan Peevski is "a highly controversial figure in Bulgarian politics, business and media." He has served several terms of office in Bulgaria's Parliament as a DPS MP. He even served as head of the Bulgarian FBI equivalent (the State Agency for National Security) for one day, "but after mass protests broke out in the streets was forced to hand in his resignation."

European representation 
In the European Parliament, Movement for Rights and Freedoms sits in the Renew Europe group with three MEPs.

In the European Committee of the Regions, Movement for Rights and Freedoms sits in the Renew Europe CoR group with two full and two alternate members for the 2020-2025 mandate. Nedzhmi Ali is member of the Renew Europe CoR Bureau.

References and notes

See also
Political machine
List of liberal parties
Political parties of minorities
Liberalism and radicalism in Bulgaria
Turks in Bulgaria

External links

Liberal International
Liberal parties in Bulgaria
Centrist parties in Bulgaria
Political parties of minorities
Alliance of Liberals and Democrats for Europe Party member parties
Turkish political parties
Turkish diaspora in Europe